Hash cakes may refer to:
 Hash browns, a fried potato breakfast food
 Cannabis edible, a food prepared from cannabis extract